Whitesboro is a village in Oneida County, New York, United States. The population was 3,772 at the 2010 census. The village is named after Hugh White, an early settler.

The Village of Whitesboro is inside the Town of Whitestown.

History 
The village began to be settled in 1784, and was incorporated in 1813. An 1851 list gave the name Che-ga-quat-ka for Whitesboro in a language of the Iroquois people.

The abolitionist Oneida Institute was located in Whitesboro from 1827 to 1843.

The older part of the village was bordered by the Erie Canal and the village's Main Street. When the canal was filled in the first half of the 20th century, Oriskany Boulevard was built over the filled-in canal. The streets that connect the two roads form the oldest part of the village.

The Whitestown Town Hall was listed on the National Register of Historic Places in 1973. It currently serves as the village courthouse, while offices for the Town of Whitestown are housed in newer buildings outside of Whitesboro.

Village seal controversy

The Whitesboro seal, originating in the early 1900s, displays founder Hugh White wrestling an Oneida Native American. The seal has been controversial because it has been interpreted as a settler choking the Native American; city officials contend it depicts a friendly wrestling match that White won, gaining the respect of the Oneida. The current version of the seal was created in 1970, after a lawsuit by a Native American group: the version used before the suit showed the settler's hands on the Native American's neck instead of his shoulders. In 1999, Mayor John Malecki suggested a contest for a new seal, but received no submissions.

The seal received attention in 2015 as part of national discussion about display of the Confederate flag. In January 2016, the town cooperated with Comedy Central's The Daily Show to hold a non-binding vote for a new village seal. Many of the alternative seals were humorous, including one depicting the two men as luchadores and another depicting an arm wrestling contest. Village residents voted 157 to 55 to keep the seal as-is. Afterwards, Mayor Patrick O'Connor was criticized for not disclosing Comedy Central's involvement. The Daily Show'''s January 21 show covered the vote and the controversy around the seal. At the end of the segment, correspondent Jessica Williams announced that the mayor told her that the town would change the seal. This was confirmed by a joint press release from Whitesboro and the Oneida Indian Nation the next day.

An updated seal was adopted in the summer of 2017. The new seal was created by a communication design student at PrattMWP in Utica, under direction of a professor there. While the new seal depicts the same scene as the previous seal, it moves White's hands down to the Oneida chief's upper arms instead of near his neck, and neither man appears to be dominating the other.  Additionally, both men were given more realistic skin tones, and their attire was corrected for historical accuracy.

Geography
Whitesboro is located at  (43.124, -75.296).

The Sauquoit Creek forms the boundary with Yorkville. Areas of Whitesboro near the creek suffer from periodic flooding.

Demographics

As of the census of 2000, there were 3,943 people, 1,778 households, and 992 families residing in the village. The population density was 3,675.4 people per square mile (1,422.8/km2). There were 1,921 housing units at an average density of 1,790.6 per square mile (693.2/km2). The racial makeup of the village was 97.69% White, 0.53% African American, 0.03% Native American, 0.33% Asian, 0.53% from other races, and 0.89% from two or more races. Hispanic or Latino of any race were 1.47% of the population.

There were 1,778 households, out of which 27.3% had children under the age of 18 living with them, 36.9% were married couples living together, 15.0% had a female householder with no husband present, and 44.2% were non-families. 39.0% of all households were made up of individuals, and 18.7% had someone living alone who were 65 years of age or older. The average household size was 2.21 and the average family size was 2.98.

In the village, the population was spread out, with 23.3% under the age of 18, 7.8% from 18 to 24, 31.7% from 25 to 44, 20.3% from 45 to 64, and 17.0% who were 65 years of age or older. The median age was 37 years. For every 100 females, there were 86.7 males. For every 100 females age 18 and over, there were 81.2 males.

The median income for a household in the village was $31,947, and the median income for a family was $42,741. Males had a median income of $29,408 versus $25,865 for females. The per capita income for the village was $17,386.

Notable people
 Sidney Breese, Illinois pioneer
 Calvert Coggeshall, painter
 Alexander L. Collins, politician
 Simon Newton Dexter, politician
 Robert Esche, former professional ice hockey goaltender, currently President of the Utica Comets
 John Frink, writer and executive producer for The Simpsons''
 George Washington Gale, founder of the Oneida Institute of Science and Industry, later the Oneida Institute
 Thomas R. Gold, politician
 Beriah Green, president of the Oneida Institute
 John Grimes, Roman Catholic bishop
 Mark Lemke, former Major League baseball player with the Atlanta Braves
 William A. Moseley, former US Congressman
 Mark Mowers, former professional ice hockey winger
 Harry S. Patten, politician
 Charles Edward Pearce, congressman
 Fred Sisson, politician
 John T. Spriggs, politician
 Henry R. Storrs, lawyer
 Johnny Sullivan, wrestler
 William Whipple Warren, 19th-century historian of the Ojibwe and Minnesota Territory legislator, attended school at the Oneida Institute
 Philo White, former Wisconsin state senator, U.S. diplomat

References

External links
 
 Village of Whitesboro, NY

Villages in New York (state)
Utica–Rome metropolitan area
Villages in Oneida County, New York